Hatsavan (also Romanized as Hats’avan and Atsavan; formerly, Avdalar) is a town in the Kotayk Province of Armenia.

See also 
Kotayk Province

References 

Populated places in Kotayk Province